Mohammad-Hadi Shadmehr was an Iranian military officer who served as the Chief-of-Staff of the Islamic Republic of Iran Army from February 1980 until 17 June 1980. Shadmehr was appointed by then-commander-in-chief of Iran Abolhassan Banisadr and was sacked due to "failure to stop the American incursion" in Operation Eagle Claw.

References

2008 deaths
Islamic Republic of Iran Army major generals